The Woman Under Cover is a lost 1919 American silent drama film directed by George Siegmann and starring Fritzi Brunette. It was based on a play by Sada Cowan and produced and distributed by the Universal Film Manufacturing Company.

Plot
As described in a film magazine, Yvonne (La Rue), an actress, murders her husband following a quarrel, and upon threat of exposure promises to marry Billy (Spingler), a chorus man who has discovered her guilt. When she refuses to carry out her agreement and accepts the attentions of a wealthy broker, Billy (Spingler) tells his story to The Leader, a newspaper. Mac (McDaniel), the city editor, assigns Alma (Brunette), a woman reporter, the task of securing Yvonne's confession to verify the story that was given to the newspaper. She is a sister of Billy but is unaware of his involvement in the story. After securing the confession, Alma discovers Billy's involvement, but still telephones her scoop to the newspaper. Much to her surprise, the exposure of her brother's involvement fails to discourage the love of Mac for her, and the final closeup finds Mac and Alma married.

Cast
Fritzi Brunette as Alma Jordan
George A. McDaniel as Mac (credited as George McDaniel)
Harry Spingler as Billy Jordan
Fontaine La Rue as Yvonne Leclaire
Edward Cecil
Carl Stockdale
Fred Gamble
Marian Skinner (credited as Marion Skinner)

References

External links

1919 films
American silent feature films
American films based on plays
Lost American films
American black-and-white films
Silent American drama films
1919 drama films
1919 lost films
Lost drama films
Films directed by George Siegmann
1910s American films
1910s English-language films